Veronica (variants in other languages: Veronika, Verónica, Verônica, Véronique, Weronika, Вероника) is a female given name, a Latin alteration of the Greek name Berenice (Βερενίκη), which in turn is derived from the Macedonian form of the Athenian Φερενίκη, Phereníkē, or Φερονίκη, Pheroníkē, from φέρειν, phérein, to bring, and νίκη, níkê, "victory", i.e. "she who brings victory".

The Ancient Macedonian form of the name was extensively used as a royal feminine name by the reigning dynasties of the states of the Diadochi of Alexander the Great throughout the Eastern Mediterranean during the Hellenistic age, most notably by the Ptolemies of Egypt and by the Seleucids of the Levant. In medieval etymology, Veronica was sometimes supposed to derive from Latin vera (true) and Greek eikon (image).

Its popularity in medieval and modern times is derived from the prominence in Christianity of Saint Veronica and her Veil of Veronica. Pet forms of Veronica include Ronnie and Roni and the German Vroni. In Russian, the pet form is Nika (Ника). "Veronica" is a popular name in many countries in the Mediterranean, Eastern Europe, and Latin America, and also Ireland, France, and French-speaking Canada.

Given name
Veronica (singer) (born 1974), American dance music singer
Veronica Ballestrini (born 1991), American singer
Veronica Belmont (born 1982), American Internet TV and webcasting host
Veronica Bennett (1943–2022), American singer better known as Ronnie Spector
Veronika Bromová (born 1966), Czech painter
Veronika Buroňová, Czech weightlifter in 2001 World Weightlifting Championships – Women's 63 kg and 2003 World Weightlifting Championships – Women's 63 kg
Veronica Campbell-Brown (born 1982), Jamaican track and field sprint athlete
Veronica Carlson (1944–2022), English model and actress
Veronica Cartwright (born 1949), American actress
Verónica Castro (born 1952), Mexican actress
Veronica Chou (born 1984/1985), Hong Kong businesswoman
Veronika Chvojková (born 1987), Czech tennis player
Veronica de la Cruz (born 1980), American television news anchor
 Veronica Perrule Dobson (born 1944), Australian linguist and ecologist 
Veronica Duterte, the daughter of Philippine president Rodrigo Duterte with Honeylet Avanceña
Veronika Dytrtová (born 1980), Czech figure skater
Veronika Exler (born 1990), Austrian chess player 
Veronika Fenclová (born 1981), Czech sailor
Veronica Ferres (born 1965), German actress
Veronica Finn, member of American pop group Innosense 1997–2003
Veronika Foltová (born 1980), Czech Paralympic athlete
Veronica Franco (1546–1591), poet and courtesan in 16th century Venice
Veronika Freimanová (born 1955), Czech actress
Veronika Gajerová (active 1980–2008), Czech actress in Housata, Who's That Soldier? and Dobrá čtvrť
Veronica Guerin (1958–1996), murdered Irish journalist
Veronica Giuliani (1660–1727), Italian mystic
Veronica Gorrie (born 1971/1972), Aboriginal Australian writer
Veronika Gut (1757–1829), Swiss rebel heroine
Veronika Harcsa (born 1982), Hungarian singer and songwriter
Veronika Havlíčková (born 1987), Czech figure skater
Veronica Hazelhoff (1947–2009), Dutch writer
Veronika Hoferková (born 1982), Czech footballer
Veronica Hurst (1931–2022), English actress
Veronika Ivasiuk (born 1995), Ukrainian weightlifter
Veronika Jeníková, Czech actress in Vražda v salonním coupé, Housata, Bony a klid and Victims and Murderers
Veronica Johnson, American meteorologist
Veronika Kormos (born 1992), Hungarian cyclist
Veronika Kropotina (born 1991), Russian figure skater
Veronika Kubařová, Czech actress in Lidice
Veronika Kudermetova (born 1997), Russian tennis player
Veronica Lake (1922–1973), American film actress
Veronica Lindholm (born 1984), Swedish politician
Veronika Machová (born 1990), Czech beauty pageant contestant
Veronica Maggio (born 1981), Swedish pop singer
Veronika Martinek (born 1972), German tennis player
Veronica Mehta (active since 1996), British Asian singer
Veronica Micle (1850–1889), Imperial Austrian-born Romanian poet
Veronika Moos-Brochhagen (born 1961), German textile artist
Veronika Morávková (born 1983), Czech ice dancer
Veronica Merrell (born 1996), American actress and YouTuber
Veronica Olivier (born 1990), Italian actress 
Verónica Orozco (born 1979), Colombian actress and singer
Verónica Páez (born 1974), Argentine marathon runner
Veronika Part (born 1978), Russian ballet dancer
Veronica Perez (born 1988), Mexican footballer
Veronika Pincová (born 1989), Czech footballer
Veronika Poláčková (born 1982), Czech actress
Veronika Portsmuth (born 1980), Estonian conductor
Veronica Pyke (born 1981), Australian cricketer
Veronika Remenárová (born 1997), Slovak basketball player
Verónica Ribot (born 1962), Argentine diver
Veronica Roth (born 1988), American dystopian author 
Veronika Sabolová (born 1980), Slovak luger
Veronika Šarec (born 1969), Slovenian skier
Veronica Scopelliti (born 1982), Italian singer Noemi
Veronika Schmidt (born 1952), German skier
Veronica Scott (born 1986), American fashion designer, Fuchsia CEO, television personality
Veronika Sprügl (born 1987), Austrian cyclist
Veronika Sramaty (born 1977), Slovak painter
Veronika Stallmaier (born 1964), Austrian skier
Veronica Taylor (active since 1997), American voice actress
Veronika Valk (born 1976), Estonian architect
Veronika Vařeková (born 1977), Czech model
Veronika Velez-Zuzulová (born 1984), Slovak skier
Veronica Vera (active since 1977), American sexuality writer and actress
Veronica Varlow (born 1979), American dancer and actress
Verónica Villarroel (active since 1989), Chilean opera singer
Veronika Vítková (born 1988), Czech biathlete
Veronica Wagner (born 1987), Swedish gymnast
Veronika Žilková (born 1961), Czech actress
Verónica Zondek (born 1953), Chilean poet and translator

In fiction
Veronica Ashford, 1st Countess Ashford, a 19th-century British noblewoman and the founder of aristocratic Ashford family in Resident Evil – Code: Veronica
Veronica Lodge, a rich teenage girl in the Archie Comics universe
Veronica Mars, a television series starring Kristen Bell as the title character
Veronica "Ronnie" Mitchell, a character from the television soap opera EastEnders
Veronica Sawyer, the protagonist of the 1988 cult teen film Heathers and its adaptations, including a musical and television adaptation
Veronica is one of the "Macaw Sisters" in the musical Love Birds
Veronica, the protagonist of the Romanian children movies Veronica and Veronica Returns
Veronica Madaraki, the surgically manufactured "sister" of the title character in the Franken Fran manga
Veronica, the protagonist of a 1989 Elvis Costello song of the same name, his highest-charting in the United States
Veronica Santangelo, a character in the video game Fallout New Vegas
Veronica Liones, a character in the manga series Nanatsu no Taizai
Veronica, the sister of Lance from the DreamWorks animated web show Voltron: Legendary Defender
Veronika, protagonist in popular novel Veronika Decides to Die by Paulo Coelho
Veronica, the protagonist of the first episode of Just Beyond
Veronica, one of the main characters from the video game Dragon Quest XI

References

Greek feminine given names
Armenian feminine given names
Albanian feminine given names
Irish feminine given names
Italian feminine given names
Spanish feminine given names
Portuguese feminine given names
Romanian feminine given names
Russian feminine given names
Ukrainian feminine given names
Polish feminine given names
Czech feminine given names
Slovak feminine given names
Hungarian feminine given names
Bulgarian feminine given names
Serbian feminine given names
Slovene feminine given names
Croatian feminine given names
Latvian feminine given names
Lithuanian feminine given names